What's That Noise? is the debut album by Coldcut, released in 1989.

Guests on the album include: Lisa Stansfield on "People Hold On" and "My Telephone", Mark E. Smith (The Fall) on "(I'm) In Deep", Junior Reid on "Stop This Crazy Thing", Queen Latifah on "Smoke 1" and Yazz on "Doctorin' the House".

The album peaked at No. 20 on the UK Albums Chart.

Critical reception
The album was featured in the book 1001 Albums You Must Hear Before You Die.

Trouser Press wrote: "In between the vocal tracks are various 'Beats & Pieces', as one title has it: samples, melodies and grooves that help flesh out What’s That Noise?, a patchy but generally rewarding debut." The Stranger called the album a "classic LP [that] married cut-and-paste techniques with old-fashioned songwriting smarts."

Track listing

1989 UK release
Side A
 "People Hold On" (featuring Lisa Stansfield) – 3:58
 "Fat (Party and Bullshit)" – 4:34
 "(I'm) In Deep" (featuring Mark E. Smith) – 5:23
 "My Telephone" (featuring Lisa Stansfield) – 5:26
 "Theme From "Reportage"" – 1:35
 "Which Doctor?" – 4:59

Side B
 "Stop This Crazy Thing" (featuring Junior Reid) – 5:57
 "No Connection" – 3:34
 "Smoke 1" – 4:51
 "Doctorin' the House" (Say R Mix) featuring Yazz – 5:18
 "What's That Noise?" – 2:56

Side C
 "Beats & Pieces" (Mo Bass Remix) – 5:55
 "Stop This Crazy Thing" (Hedmaster Mix) – 7:03

Side D
 "Maker Brake"
 "Greedy's Back"
 "Drawmasters Squeeze"
 "Trak 22"

1989 US release
 "People Hold On" (featuring Lisa Stansfield) – 3:58
 "Fat (Party and Bullshit)" – 4:17
 "(I'm) In Deep" (featuring Mark E. Smith) – 5:08
 "My Telephone" (featuring Lisa Stansfield) – 4:54
 "Theme From "Reportage"" – 1:35
 "Which Doctor?" – 4:30
 "Stop This Crazy Thing" (featuring Junior Reid) – 5:15
 "No Connection" – 3:34
 "Smoke Dis One" (Featuring Queen Latifah) – 5:40
 "Not Paid Enough" – 7:23
 "What's That Noise?" – 2:28
 "Beats & Pieces" (Mo Bass Remix) – 6:00
 "Stop This Crazy Thing" (Hedmaster Mix by Adrian Sherwood) – 7:00

Personnel
 Jonathan More – drum machine, bass, percussion, keyboard, engineering, turntable, sampler
 Matt Black – synthesizer, drum machine, keyboard, engineering, turntable, sampler
 Tony Harris – engineering
 George Shilling – engineering
 Lisa Stansfield – Vocal
 Barry Clempson – engineering
 Ian Devaney – piano, keyboard
 Merlin T. – engineering
 Dave Campbell – engineering
 John Jamieson – keyboard
 Junior Reid – vocals
 Snowboy – percussion
 Mark E. Smith – vocals
 Cleveland Watkiss – backing vocals
 Queen Latifah – vocals
 Yasmina Evans – vocals

References

External links

 What's That Noise? Album at Discogs

1989 debut albums
Coldcut albums
Tommy Boy Records albums
Alternative hip hop albums by English artists